Andrei Chesnokov defeated Petr Korda in the final, 3–6, 6–4, 6–3 to win the men's singles tennis title at the 1991 Canadian Open.

Michael Chang was the defending champion, but lost in the second round to Stefano Pescosolido.

Seeds

Draw

Finals

Top half

Section 1

Section 2

Bottom half

Section 3

Section 4

External links
 Main draw

1991 ATP Tour